Mačkovec can refer to several places in Croatia and Slovenia:

Croatia
Mačkovec, Croatia, a village near Čakovec in Međimurje County

Slovenia
Gorenji Mačkovec, a village in the Municipality of Kočevje 
Mačkovec, Kočevje, a village in the Municipality of Kočevje 
Mačkovec, Laško, a village in the Municipality of Laško
Mačkovec pri Dvoru, a village in the Municipality of Žužemberk
Mačkovec pri Škocjanu, a village in the Municipality of Škocjan
Mačkovec pri Suhorju, a village in the Municipality of Metlika
Mačkovec, Trebnje, a village in the Municipality of Trebnje

See also
Mačkovac (disambiguation)